Petr Kalina (born 9 July 1997) is a Czech professional ice hockey player. He is currently playing for HC Sparta Praha of the Czech Extraliga.

Kalina made his Czech Extraliga debut playing with Mountfield HK during the 2015–16 Czech Extraliga season.

References

External links

1997 births
Living people
HC Benátky nad Jizerou players
HC Sparta Praha players
Czech ice hockey defencemen
Sportspeople from the Hradec Králové Region
People from Hradec Králové District
Stadion Hradec Králové players